Bulbophyllum reichenbachii is a species of orchid in the genus Bulbophyllum, found in northern Burma.  The orchid grows on the trunks of trees, forming clumps.

References

External links
The Bulbophyllum-Checklist
The Internet Orchid Species Photo Encyclopedia

reichenbachii